Najib Razak formed the first Najib cabinet after being invited by Tuanku Mizan Zainal Abidin to begin a new government following the resignation of the previous Prime Minister of Malaysia, Abdullah Ahmad Badawi. It was the 18th cabinet of Malaysia formed since independence. Prior to the resignation, Abdullah led (as Prime Minister) the third Abdullah cabinet, a coalition government that consisted of members of the component parties of Barisan Nasional.

Najib announced his inaugural Cabinet on 9 April 2009. Former Malaysia Airlines chief executive officer and managing director Idris Jala was added to the line-up on 28 August 2009.

Najib streamlined the Cabinet to 28 members from 32 in the previous Abdullah Ahmad Badawi administration. His new line-up came under criticism from previous Prime Minister Tun Dr. Mahathir.

This is a list of the members of the first cabinet of the sixth Prime Minister of Malaysia, Najib Razak.

Composition

Full members
The federal cabinet consisted of the following ministers:

Deputy ministers

See also
 Members of the Dewan Rakyat, 12th Malaysian Parliament
 Frontbench Committees of Anwar Ibrahim

References

Cabinet of Malaysia
2009 establishments in Malaysia
2013 disestablishments in Malaysia
Cabinets established in 2009
Cabinets disestablished in 2013